The 2015 Santos Tour Down Under was the 17th edition of the Tour Down Under stage race. It took place from 20 to 25 January in and around Adelaide, South Australia, and was the first race of the 2015 UCI World Tour. The overall winner was Rohan Dennis.

Schedule

Participating teams
As the Tour Down Under is a UCI World Tour event, all 17 UCI ProTeams were invited automatically and obligated to send a squad. Australian team  received a wildcard invitation and, together with a selection of Australian riders forming the  squad, this formed the event's 19 team peloton.

Cadel Evans stated that it would be his last race in his professional career.

The 19 teams invited to the race are:

Stages

Stage 1
20 January 2015 – Tanunda to Campbelltown,

Stage 2
21 January 2015 – Unley to Stirling,

Stage 3
22 January 2015 – Norwood to Paracombe,

Stage 4
23 January 2015 – Glenelg to Mount Barker,

Stage 5
24 January 2015 – McLaren Vale to Willunga Hill,

Stage 6
25 January 2015 – Adelaide,

Classification leadership table

References

External links

Tour Down Under
Tour Down Under
Tour Down Under
Tour